The Little Belt is a strait between the island of Funen and the Jutland Peninsula in Denmark. It is one of the three Danish Straits that drain and connect the Baltic Sea to the Kattegat strait, which drains west to the North Sea and Atlantic Ocean.

Geography

Numerous small Danish islands lie within the belt. In part because of its depth, 10% of the water moving between the inner Baltic Sea and the Kattegat flows through the Little Belt.

The Little Belt stretches from the town of Juelsminde in the north to the island of Als in the south, with a winding course in between. South of Fænø, the strait widens to about  until it reaches the Baltic Sea near Als and the South Funen Archipelago.

The Little Belt's western coastline is largely broken up by irregular inlets called fjords, and both sides feature steep sand bluffs.

Geology 
The area around the Little Belt is shaped by numerous glacial moraines, the first of which was formed during the early Weichsel glaciation approximately 22-25,000 years ago. Approximately 14-15,000 years ago, during the late Weichsel glaciation, ice arrived from the south and southeast, one part of which became the Little Belt Glacier, causing hilly terrain with deep fjords.  The notable tunnel valleys were formed by meltwater. The terminal moraines from the northeast ice's glacial maximum are some of the oldest in Denmark.

Nature 

The Little Belt is a protected wetland under the Ramsar Convention and a particularly important spot for breeding and migrating birds. Protected species in the area include whooper swans, white-tailed eagles, western marsh harriers, spotted crakes, corn crakes, pied avocets, ruffs, short-eared owls, common terns, Arctic terns, little terns, greater scaups, common eiders, common goldeneyes, and red-breasted mergansers.

The Little Belt has the highest known density of harbour porpoises in the world, and is home to several thousand individuals. It is the only resident cetacean in the inner Danish waters. Observation tours are accessible nearby as well. Other species such as minke, humpback, and fin whales visit the waters rather sporadically. The deep waters attract many species of fish, including cod, herring, and sea trout, and the Little Belt is a destination for recreational fishing.

History

Prehistoric settlements 
Human populations lived around the Little Belt during the Stone Age, hunting aurochs, reindeer, and other game in the tunnel valleys and forests. Climate and geological changes brought new plants and animals to the area and made the fishery in the fjords and neighboring archipelagoes into an important food source. Around 4000 BC, temperatures rose again, and the Funnelbeaker culture was active in the area. There are many archaeological sites from the Funnelbeaker culture and other Neolithic cultures in the area.

Throughout the Bronze Age, Iron Age, and Viking Age, trade with other populations increased, and settlements became larger and more permanent. In the 14th century, the towns of Kolding and Vejle received merchant town privileges, and today they are the area's two largest towns.

Porpoise hunting

From the Middle Ages until the end of the 19th century, local fishermen were also involved in harbour porpoise hunting. Harbor porpoises winter in Danish waterways, and fishermen would wait in the narrow parts of the belt and drive them to the shallows where they would be slaughtered. Porpoise oil, a type of whale oil, was in widespread use as a lamp oil until the spread of electric lighting undermined the porpoise hunting economy. In the winter of 1854-55, 1,742 porpoises were captured, but otherwise, the catch from most winters was around 700-800 porpoises. Porpoise hunting was regulated by laws dating to at least 1593. The law was overturned by a royal resolution on May 4, 1899, although shortages during World War I and II caused short-lived resurgences in porpoise hunting.

Modern era

In 1801 the Danish Navy launched a 22-gun warship named Lillebælt for the strait. After the 1807 Battle of Copenhagen she was surrendered to the British Royal Navy, where her name was anglicized to HMS Little Belt, and she took part in the then notorious Little Belt affair in North American waters. Later the Royal Navy bestowed the name "Little Belt" on another ship, which had no Danish antecedents.

19th century proponents of German unification advocated considering the Little Belt (German: Kleiner Belt) as the northern border of Germany, and the Belt is mentioned in this context in Ernst Mortiz Arndt's Was ist des Deutschen Vaterland? (1813) and the Deutschlandlied (1841), the third stanza of which is the current German national anthem. This reflects the fact that the Denmark-Germany border has shifted several times over the centuries, so that the current Danish region of Southern Jutland was once part of the Duchy of Schleswig.

The Little Belt has historically been an important shipping channel. In the present day, it is popular among divers for its archaeological sites and shipwrecks.

Infrastructure 

Various ferry services have crossed the Little Belt over the years, including the Snoghøj-Middelfart ferry, followed by the Fredericia-Strib ferry, which became Denmark's first train ferry in 1872. Ferry crossings were replaced by the Old Little Belt Bridge in 1935 and the New Little Belt Bridge in 1970. Today, the old bridge carries local traffic and train lines, while the new bridge carries the E20 motorway.

Two power lines also previously crossed the Little Belt, the first of which was dismantled and replaced by an undersea cable in 2013.

See also 
Danish Straits includes the Little Belt.
Great Belt strait
Øresund strait

References 

Straits of Denmark
Straits of the Baltic Sea
Ramsar sites in Denmark